There have been three baronetcies created for descendants of the ancient Lancashire family of Gerard.

The Baronetcy of Gerard of Bryn Lancashire was created in the Baronetage of England in 1611 for Thomas Gerard, Member of Parliament for Liverpool, Lancashire, and Wigan who was a direct descendant of the family of Bryn. From him derived a line of baronets that was elevated to the peerage in 1879, when the baronetcy was merged with the title of Barons Gerard of Bryn, with which it descends to the present holder, the seventeenth baronet.

The Baronetcy of Gerard of Harrow on the Hill was created in the Baronetage of England on 12 April 1620 for Gilbert Gerard of Flambards, Harrow on the Hill, Middlesex, ( the nephew of Gilbert Gerard, Attorney General 1559–81, of Gerards Bromley, Staffordshire) who was Member of Parliament for Wigan 1614, Middlesex 1621–48 and Lancaster 1660. His son Francis, the second Baronet represented Seaford 1641–48, Middlesex 1659 and Bossiney in 1660. His son Charles, third Baronet, was the member for Middlesex 1685–95 and Cockermouth 1695–98. His two brothers followed as fourth and fifth Baronets but the Baronetcy was extinct on the death of the latter in 1716. The Flambards estate passed to the daughter of the third Baronet and was sold off in 1767.

The Baronetcy of Gerard of Fiskerton, Lincolnshire was created on 17 November 1666 for Gilbert Gerard a great-grandson of Gilbert Gerard, Attorney General. His second wife was Mary Cosin, daughter of John Cosin the Bishop of Durham. Sir Gilbert acquired an estate at Gateshead Durham and was elected Member of Parliament for Northallerton in 1661. He was appointed by his father in law as High Sheriff of Durham in 1665. He was buried in York Minster in 1687. He was succeeded by his son Gilbert Cosin-Gerard on whose death in 1730 the Baronetcy was extinct.

Gerard Baronets, of Bryn (1611)
 Sir Thomas Gerard, 1st Baronet (1560–1621)
 Sir Thomas Gerard, 2nd Baronet (c. 1584–1630)
 Sir William Gerard, 3rd Baronet (1612–1681)
 Sir William Gerard, 4th Baronet (1638–1702)
 Sir William Gerard, 5th Baronet (1662–1721)
 Sir William Gerard, 6th Baronet] (1697–1732)
 Sir William Gerard, 7th Baronet (1721–1740)
 Sir Thomas Gerard, 8th Baronet (c. 1723–1780)
 Sir Robert Gerard, 9th Baronet (c. 1725–1784)
 Sir Robert Gerard, 10th Baronet (d. 1791)
 Sir William Gerard, 11th Baronet (1773–1826)
 Sir John Gerard, 12th Baronet (1804–1854)
 Sir Robert Gerard, 13th Baronet (1808–1887) (created Baron Gerard in 1876)
 Sir William Gerard, 2nd Baron Gerard, 14th Baronet (1851-1902) (2nd Baron Gerard)
 Sir Frederick Gerard, 3rd Baron Gerard, 15th Baronet (1883-1953) (3rd Baron Gerard)
 Sir Robert Gerard, 4th Baron Gerard, 16th Baronet (1918-1992) (4th Baron Gerard)
 Sir Anthony Gerard, 5th Baron Gerard, 17th Baronet (b. 1949) (5th Baron Gerard)

Gerard of Harrow on the Hill, Middlesex (1620)
 Sir Gilbert Gerard, 1st Baronet of Harrow on the Hill (1587–1670)
 Sir Francis Gerard, 2nd Baronet (1617–1680)
 Sir Charles Gerard, 3rd Baronet (1653–1701)
 Sir Francis Gerard, 4th Baronet (died 1704)
 Sir Cheeke Gerard, 5th Baronet (1662–1716)

Gerard of Fiskerton, Lincolnshire (1666)
 Sir Gilbert Gerard, 1st Baronet of Fiskerton (died 1687)
 Sir Gilbert Cosin-Gerard, 2nd Baronet (1662–1730)

See also
John Gerard (Jesuit) 1564–1637, younger brother of the 1st Baronet Gerard of Bryn

References

 

Extinct baronetcies in the Baronetage of England
1611 establishments in England